This list has been split for convenience:

Timeline of the Israeli–Palestinian conflict in January–June 2015
Timeline of the Israeli–Palestinian conflict in July–December 2015

See also 
 2015–2016 wave of violence in the Israeli–Palestinian conflict